SIDF can mean:

 Sender ID Framework
 Sheffield International Documentary Festival, known as Sheffield Doc/Fest
 The Saudi Industrial Development Fund (SIDF)
 Sugar Industry Diversification Foundation (SIDF)
 System Independent Data Format (ISO/IEC 14863 & ECMA-208)